Veska is a shopping mall in the Partola district of Pirkkala, Finland. Its original part was completed in 2003 and the expansion part in early 2017. After the construction of the expansion part the mall was renovated, which was completed in November 2018. Veska has two floors and over 30 stores. A hotel named Veska Hotelli has also been planned in connection to the mall, whose construction would begin in 2020 at the earliest.

Shops and services

Household items and hardware
 Iittala
 Isku
 Jysk
 Kvik
 Thread shop Villa Pallo

Pet supplies
 Peten Koiratarvike

Exercise and wellness
 Fysiotoma
 HDC Finland
 HopLop
 Hyve
 Voactum
 Jersey53
 MyFascia

Clothing and sports
 Click Shoes
 Dressmann
 H&M
 Jack&Jones
 KappAhl
 Ripsi- ja kynsistudio B
 Vero Moda

Restaurants
 Burger King
 Fire Wok
 Itsudemo
 Ninan keittiö
 Subway
 Ståhlberg Kahvila

Other services
 Kapsäkki
 Municipality of Pirkkala

References

Shopping centres in Pirkkala